Xin is the romanization of several Chinese surnames including Xīn 辛, Xīn 新 and Xìn 信, etc. Xīn 辛 is the most common one among these names, it is 379th surname in Hundred Family Surnames.

origin of Xin

辛
Chinese Xin (辛) family originated from;
Xia Hou (夏后) family in the Xia Dynasty period
Shen (莘) family in the Xia Dynasty period
Zang (藏) and Tujia (土家) the Chinese Minority 
Xiang (項) family the Ji (姬) family in Later Zhou Dynasty period 
Beidi the Donghu people 
Also written "Sun" in Cantonese.

信
Chinese Xin (信) family originated from;
Ji (姬) family of Wei (state)
Manchu people at Qing Dynasty period

新
Chinese Xin (新) family originated from;
Ji (姬) family of Zhou Dynasty
Ji (姬) family of Jin (state) (晉)
Mongolian of Yuan Dynasty period

Notable people named Xin

Xīn 辛
Master Wen, attributed author of Wenzi
Xin Zhui (died 163 BC), Marquise of Dai
Xin Ping, d. 204 - minister to Han Fu in Eastern Han Dynasty
Xin Pi, minister for the Cao Wei empire
Xin Xianying, b. 205 - daughter of Xin Pi
Empress Xin (Zhang Zuo), wife of the Chinese state Former Liang's ruler Zhang Zuo
Xin Maojiang, Tang Dynasty chancellor 
Empress Xin, wife of Shi Siming
Xin Qiji, poet and statesman in Southern Song Dynasty
Hsin Wen-bing b. 1912, Taiwanese politician.
Jaime Sin, b. 1928 - former archbishop of Manila
Xin Kegui, b. 1950 - professor at Tsinghua University
Winnie Hsin, b. 1962 - singer in Taiwan

Xìn 信
 Hsin Shih-chang, Deputy Minister of the Overseas Community Affairs Council of the Republic of China
 Xin Dufang, mathematician in Northern Qi Dynasty
 Xin Changxing (信长星; born 1963) is a Chinese politician, currently serving as Deputy Communist Party Secretary of Anhui province

See also
Shin (Korean name)
Tan (Vietnamese name)

Multiple Chinese surnames

References

Chinese-language surnames